Ljungsbro is a locality situated area in Linköping Municipality, Östergötland County, Sweden with 6,620 inhabitants in 2010. It is located about 15 kilometers from the city of Linköping.

Through Ljungsbro runs Motala ström (stream) and Göta Canal. In the stream are the power stations of Nykvarn and Malfors. Malfors has a height of drop of 28,3-meter and Nykvarn has one of 4,3, however, Nykvarn is no longer running. The canal can be crossed via a navigable aqueduct, Sweden's second after Håverud, but also via a bridge, Malforsbron (Malfors Bridge). Since 2005, a summer café called Malfors Café och Brygga (Malfors Café and Bridge) is located by the bridge.

Ljungsbro Fritidscenter (leisure center) is located about 400 meters from the bridge. Here you can stay the night, train at gym or go swimming. There is also an indoors ice hockey rink.

The confectioners Cloetta is the largest industry in the area. On weekdays and Saturdays there is a popular market selling "Kex"-chocolate biscuit wafers and other chocolate products, which attracts many tourists.

In the centre lies the main health centre and shops, among other things there are opticians, libraries, a watchmaker, a company that sells and lays tiles and a tobacco shop. Many of the houses were built in the 1950s for the workers of the Cloetta factory.

There are two churches in the town, Allhelgonakyrkan and Filadelfiakyrkan.

By its residents, Ljungsbro is sometimes called Pickhult.

Famous people from Ljungsbro

Mons Kallentoft, writer and journalist

References

External links 

Populated places in Östergötland County
Populated places in Linköping Municipality